Robert Michael Pittilo  (7 October 1954 – 16 February 2010) was a British biologist and Principal and vice-chancellor of the Robert Gordon University, in Aberdeen, Scotland. Pittilo worked in research and education for most of his adult life, holding a number of positions at universities throughout the United Kingdom, notably as Foundation Dean of the Faculty of Health and Social Care Sciences at Kingston University and St George's, University of London, and as Pro Vice-Chancellor of the University of Hertfordshire.

Early life
Pittilo was born in Edinburgh. He was educated at the independent Kelvinside Academy in Glasgow, and both the University of Strathclyde and University of East London, where he studied biology, graduating in 1976. He then started work as an electron microscopist at Glasgow Royal Infirmary, before taking up a post as a research assistant at the North East London Polytechnic, completing an Agricultural Research Council-supported PhD on protozoan parasites of poultry in 1981.

Career
After completing his doctorate, Pittilo worked as a Postdoctoral Research Assistant at Middlesex Hospital Medical School from 1981 to 1985, before moving to Kingston University (then Kingston Polytechnic). He began as a lecturer, rising to become a senior lecturer and then reader, being appointed Professor of Biomedical Sciences and Head of the Department of Life Sciences in 1992, and Foundation Dean of the university's shared Faculty of Health and Social Care Sciences with St George's, University of London, in 1995, taking on additional responsibilities for Multiprofessional Education in 1996 and Taught Postgraduate Courses in 1999. In 2001, Pittilo was appointed Pro vice-chancellor of the University of Hertfordshire, a post he held until being appointed Principal of the Robert Gordon University in 2005.

 He was Chairman of the Regulatory Working Groups for Herbal Medicine and Acupuncture at the Department of Health from 2002 to 2003, returning to the position in 2006.

Personal life
Pittilo married Carol Blow in 1987. He was a member of the Royal Society of Medicine and the Royal Northern and University Club, Aberdeen. He died on 16 February 2010.

References

1954 births
2010 deaths
20th-century British biologists
21st-century British biologists
Academics of Kingston University
Academics of the University of Hertfordshire
Academics of St George's, University of London
People associated with Robert Gordon University
Alumni of the University of East London
Alumni of the University of Strathclyde
People educated at Kelvinside Academy
Academics from Edinburgh
Members of the Order of the British Empire